Enver Creek Secondary School is a public high school located in Surrey, British Columbia, Canada and is part of the School District 36 Surrey.

Academics
Students are required to enroll in English, Social Studies, Mathematics, Sciences, and Physical Education. Most academic areas offer honours courses.  Advanced Placement courses are available for English, Calculus, Art, and now Chemistry, at the grade 12 level.  Second language studies are offered in French, Spanish., and Punjabi.  Physical Fitness requirements allow students to select Physical education, Weight Training or Fitness.  Elective areas of study span two main areas Applied Skills, which include Computers, Business, Woodwork, Metalwork, Electronics, Engineering, plus Foods or Cook Training.  Fine Arts studies, " which include Dance, Art, Media, Band, and Photography.
The school operates on a semester system of two - 5 month terms.  Many students also elect to enrol in free, full-credit summer school offered by the school district during the summer months.

Mathematics
Mathematics at Enver Creek are divided into three categories for different levels of career or post secondary preparation.  During the first year, students are able to enter  Math 8 Honours, Math 8 regular or Math 8 with Learning Assistance.  In Math 10 the courses diverge into two levels for students to choose Apprenticeship & Workplace 10 and Foundations & Pre-Calculus 10.  In Math 11, the courses diverge into 3 levels where students choose Apprenticeship & Workplace 11, Foundations 11, and Pre-Calculus 11.  In grade 12 students have the option of electing Pre-Calculus Math 12 and Calculus 12 in preparation for post secondary. Math at the grade 12 level is optional.

International students
The number of International students enrolled at Enver Creek  doubled from 2010 to 2011. Students from a variety of countries travel to Enver Creek Secondary to study for usually one or two semesters.

Athletics
The school won the Provincial AAA Senior Boys' Soccer Championship on November 26, 2011.

School Freestyle wrestling team competition winners; Aron Mann, Silver Medal 2012 B.C. Wrestling Champion, Karnbir Johal, B.C. Champion and Canadian Champion in 2011; Jagraj Basra, B.C. Champion in 2009; and Aaron Badasha, B.C. Champion in 2006.

The Enver Creek Senior Boys' Basketball team finished third in the Surrey-wide RCMP basketball tournament in 2012. In 2011, the team won the tournament. The tournament invites all public and private, junior and senior, boys' basketball teams in the City of Surrey, British Columbia to participate.

Sports
The school generally offers 3 levels of individual and teams sports for both male and female students; grade 8, junior (grade 9 and 10), and senior (grade 11 and 12).  Enver Creek sports teams have done extremely well in the past 10 years, due in no small part to the commitment and motivation of the students coupled with the dedication, passion, and knowledge of the school coaching staff.

Enver Creek has a wide variety of sports teams, including:

 Badminton
 Basketball
 Cricket
 Cross country running
 Volleyball
 Golf
 Ice hockey
 Rugby
 Soccer
 Track and Field
 Freestyle wrestling

Fine arts
Dance students win multiple awards at the Surrey District-wide dance competition, January 2012. Advanced Class placed 1st in the Senior Class Division.

The student body stays informed and entertained through Enver Creek T.V. (ECTV), a student-produced video presentation shown regularly over the school-wide broadcasting network.

Media Arts students win first and third place awards at the 2011 B.C. Student Film Festival. At the 2011 Surrey High School Film Festival, students were also recognized with a first-place finish and four finalist awards.

Drama students win multiple awards at the Surrey One-Act Drama Festival, February 2013 and 2018.

Applied skills
The Enver Creek Robotics club finds success at the multi-school competition on Vancouver Island.

Enver Creek to host the Regional 'Skills Canada' Competition for Cabinetmaking, March 2012.

Annual School Events

Annually, Mathematics students compete nationally against their grade level.  The contests are offered by the University of Waterloo.  Grade 8: Gauss, Grade 9: Pascal, Grade 10: Cayley, Grade 11: Fermat, and Grade 12: Euclid.  The names of contest winners are engraved on plaques that are permanently displayed in the Math wing of the school.

Community involvement

Protecting the environment
The  Green Team has become an integral part of the operation of Enver Creek School. Their mission is to raise awareness and keep the environment stable. The Team maintains a recycling program that recovers products from paper to electronics.

Blood donation
The school won the first annual Young Blood Challenge, in 2006–07, by donating more blood than any other school in British Columbia.

Clubs and activities
The school offers a variety of extra-curricular clubs:

 Action/Anti-bullying Team
 Bollywood/Bhangra Team
 Dance Team
 Grad Council
 EC Model United Nations(MUN)
 Fly Fishing
 Green Team
 Life Drawing
 Math
 Anti-Bullying Club
 Newspaper
 Outreach Charities
 Robotics
 Science Club
 Snowboard and Ski Club
 Student Council
 Weight Training

The students publish an award-winning school yearbook. There are also various student-organized events such as music nights, socials, and school dances which are organized by students and supervised by teachers and administrators.

Notable graduates

Matthew Jarvis is a poker player known for his November Nine appearance in the 2010 World Series of Poker. He earned his first World Series of Poker bracelet at the 2011 World Series of Poker.

Student Suicide

Hamed Nastoh leapt to his death, from the Pattullo Bridge, in March 2000. He left a suicide note complaining about bullying.  Now the school Action/Anti-Bullying Team (or A Team) under the title "Stand-UP-People" works school-wide to enhance peer relations in the general population.  The results are thought to be positive changes to bullying, reduced use of inappropriate language and peer pressure, plus increased social responsibility and altruism, though it isn't a credible claim to say so without a credible source. Students also wear pink anti-bullying shirts annually in February.

References

External links
 

High schools in Surrey, British Columbia
Educational institutions established in 1997
1997 establishments in British Columbia